The following is a list of military aircraft currently used by People's Liberation Army Air Force. For a list of current aircraft in all branches of the People's Liberation Army, see here.

Aircraft

Aircraft

References 

Aircraft
China
Aircraft